Simon Stock, O.Carm was an English Catholic priest and saint who lived in the 13th century and was an early prior of the Carmelite order. The Blessed Virgin Mary is traditionally said to have appeared to him and given him the Carmelite habit, the Brown Scapular. Thus, popular devotion to Stock is usually associated with devotion to Our Lady of Mount Carmel.

Life
The Brothers of the Blessed Virgin Mary of Mount Carmel had their origins as a Christian hermit community in Palestine; with the  enfeebling and fall of the Crusader Kingdoms and the resumption of Muslim rule, in the early 13th century the members moved to Europe where they became mendicant friars. Simon was born in England and became an early leader of the Order soon after it migrated to that country.

Historical evidence about Simon's life comes primarily from medieval catalogues of saints and of Carmelite priors general, which are not consistent with one another in their details. The earliest of these describe Simon as someone known for holiness during his life, and miracles attested to this after his death. The surname "Stock" appears in some documents but not in others, and is related to a story that Simon lived for a time in a hollow tree ("stock" meant tree trunk) before the arrival of the Carmelites in England, in keeping with prophetic tradition.

He is believed to have lived at Aylesford in Kent, a place that hosted in 1247 the first general chapter of the Carmelite Order held outside the Holy Land, and where there is still a monastery of Carmelite friars. Simon was probably the fifth or sixth prior general of the Carmelites (historical evidence suggests perhaps from about 1256–1266). During his service, the order spread widely in southern and western Europe, especially in England. Stock is credited with founding houses in the university cities of that era, as in 1248 at Cambridge, in 1253 at Oxford, in 1260 at Paris and Bologna. This action was important for both the growth of the institution and for the training of its younger members.

Stock lived an ascetic life. He lived on a diet of herbs, roots and wild apples and drank only water. He is said to have died in Bordeaux, France on May 16, though the year is not documented, and was buried there.

The earliest extant liturgical office in Simon Stock's honour was composed in Bordeaux in France, and dates from 1435. Liturgies are first known to have been celebrated in Ireland and England in 1458, and throughout the Carmelite Order in 1564. His feast day, an optional memorial, is May 16. Simon's bones are still preserved in a cathedral in Bordeaux; a tibia was brought to England in the 1860s for the Carmelite church in Kensington, London, and a part of the skull was enshrined at Aylesford in 1950. Simon Stock is the patron saint of the English province of Discalced Carmelites.

Brown Scapular

The earliest accounts of Simon's life which are still extant do not mention him having a vision. The first such reference that has survived intact dates from the late 14th century, over 100 years after the July 16, 1251 date when tradition says the vision occurred. It states that "St. Simon was an Englishman, a man of great holiness and devotion, who always in his prayers asked the Virgin to favour his Order with some singular privilege. The Virgin appeared to him holding the Scapular in her hand. In its original context, the meaning of this promise was that Carmelite religious who persevered in their vocation would be saved. Beginning in the 16th century, the Carmelites began giving the Brown Scapular to lay people who wanted to be affiliated with the Order, and it became increasingly popular as a religious article.

Carmelite tradition has held that in 1251 the Virgin Mary made the "Scapular Promise" to Simon Stock regarding the Scapular of Our Lady of Mount Carmel, namely: "whoever dies clothed in this habit shall not suffer the fires of Hell." This is understood to mean that anyone who remains faithful to the Carmelite vocation until death will be granted the grace of final perseverance. The long-standing tradition of the church has approved the vision of Simon Stock as an acceptable cult, but that is distinguishable from authenticating it as a historical experience. "The question then, from a historical perspective, is not whether Mary appeared to Simon Stock and gave him the scapular, but rather did Simon Stock perceive the Mother of God bestowing this sign of her protection on him and his brothers in Carmel." However, wearing the scapular remains a valuable devotion as a sign of one's commitment to Mary, and a pledge of her protection.

Scholarly investigation into historical source documents has raised questions about whether Simon Stock's vision actually happened, or if this tradition about him arose later, perhaps as a means of expressing in the form of a story, the strongly held Carmelite spiritual belief in the favor and protection of the Blessed Virgin Mary. Several other religious orders in the Middle Ages had similar stories of Mary giving their habit or promising protection. The great Carmelite authors of the 14th century do not mention the scapular at all. Challenges to the historicity of the scapular vision (and passionate defenses of it) are not a new phenomenon; a notable challenge came in 1653, from a scholar at the University of Paris, Jean de Launoy. In response, a Carmelite named John Cheron published a fragment of a letter  which he purported to be an account by Simon Stock's secretary Peter Swanington (or Swanyngton), giving details of Simon's life, and the scapular vision. This document was also the origin of the date that has become traditional for the vision, July 16, 1251 (July 16 was already in the 17th century the feast of Our Lady of Mount Carmel, though that liturgy made no reference to the scapular). Today, scholars affirm that this document was a forgery and Cheron himself the likely author.

Benedict Zimmerman proposed that an apparition did take place in the 13th century, but was to another Carmelite brother, which was later attributed to Simon Stock, and that the vision was not of the Virgin Mary, but of a recently deceased Carmelite. Over time, the scapular took an increasingly Marian tone, became identified with Carmelite piety toward the Virgin Mary, and the feast of Our Lady of Mount Carmel began to be called the "scapular feast".

Shortly after Vatican II, the historical uncertainties revealed by 20th-century scholars such as Ludovico Saggi, of the "Institutum Carmelitanum" in Rome, resulted in the Catholic Church briefly striking the feast day of Simon Stock from the Carmelite liturgical calendar. It was restored in 1979 as an optional memorial, on the condition that no mention be made of the scapular vision.

Devotion to the Brown Scapular remains widespread and recommended by the Catholic Church. The Carmelites continue to find meaning in the traditional story and iconography of Simon Stock receiving the scapular, particularly as reflecting their filial relationship with Mary. When Pope John Paul II addressed the Carmelite family in 2001 on the occasion of the 750th anniversary of the bestowal of the Scapular, he said that "Over time this rich Marian heritage of Carmel has become, through the spread of the Holy Scapular devotion, a treasure for the whole Church. By its simplicity, its anthropological value and its relationship to Mary's role in regard to the Church and humanity, this devotion was so deeply and widely accepted by the People of God that it came to be expressed in the memorial of 16 July on the liturgical calendar of the universal Church," the Feast of Our Lady of Mount Carmel.

According to Christian P. Ceroke: "The wearing of the Scapular fosters a true devotion to Mary that is based on her supernatural mission in the redemption of mankind. Two Marian beliefs are proposed in the devotion of the Brown Scapular: Mary's Spiritual Maternity and her Mediation of Grace."

See also
Scapular of Our Lady of Mount Carmel
Carmelites
Book of the First Monks
Constitutions of the Carmelite Order
Carmelite Rite
Hermit
St Simon Stock Catholic School
Cincture of the Theotokos relic associated with St. Thomas in the Eastern Orthodox Church

Notes

External links 

Butler's Lives of the Saints: St. Simon Stock
 

Carmelites
Priors General of the Order of Carmelites
Venerated Carmelites
Medieval Kent
People from Aylesford
Marian visionaries
Our Lady of Mount Carmel
13th-century Christian saints
Medieval English saints
1265 deaths
English Roman Catholic saints
English saints
Year of birth unknown
English hermits
13th-century English people